Ken Keyworth (24 February 1934 – 7 January 2000) was an English footballer in the 1950s and 1960s who played for Rotherham United, Coventry City and Swindon Town and most notably Leicester City.

He joined Leicester City from Rotherham United in 1958 for £9,000, where he became a prolific striker for the Foxes over 7 seasons. He was the club's top scorer for 3 seasons running in 1961-62, 1962-63 and 1963-64. He played in both the 1961 and 1963 FA Cup finals, scoring Leicester's solitary goal in the latter final. He also played in both legs of Leicester's victory in the 1964 Football League Cup Final.

Honours
Leicester City
FA Cup Runner-up: 1961, 1963
League Cup Winner: 1964

References

English footballers
English Football League players
Rotherham United F.C. players
Leicester City F.C. players
Coventry City F.C. players
Swindon Town F.C. players
Association football forwards
1934 births
2000 deaths
FA Cup Final players